Astatine (85At) has 39 known isotopes, all of which are radioactive; the range of their mass numbers is from 191 to 229. There are also 24 known metastable excited states. The longest-lived isotope is 210At, which has a half-life of 8.1 hours; the longest-lived isotope existing in naturally occurring decay chains is 219At with a half-life of 56 seconds.

List of isotopes 

|-
| 191At
| style="text-align:right" | 85
| style="text-align:right" | 106
|
| 1.7(+11−5) ms
|
|
| (1/2+)
|
|-
| style="text-indent:1em" | 191mAt
| colspan="3" style="text-indent:2em" |
| 2.1(+4−3) ms
|
|
| (7/2−)
|
|-
| rowspan=2|192At
| rowspan=2 style="text-align:right" | 85
| rowspan=2 style="text-align:right" | 107
| rowspan=2|192.00314(28)
| rowspan=2|11.5(0.6) ms
| α (99.79%)
| 188Bi
| rowspan=2|3+#
| rowspan=2|
|-
| β+, SF (0.21%)
| (various)
|-
| rowspan=2 style="text-indent:1em" | 192mAt
| rowspan=2 colspan="3" style="text-indent:2em" | 330(90)# keV
| rowspan=2| 88(6) ms
| α (99.79%)
| 188mBi
| rowspan=2| (9-, 10−)
| rowspan=2|
|-
| β+, SF (0.21%)
| (various)
|-
| 193At
| style="text-align:right" | 85
| style="text-align:right" | 108
| 192.99984(6)
| 28(+5−4) ms
| α
| 189Bi
| (1/2+)
|
|-
| style="text-indent:1em" | 193m1At
| colspan="3" style="text-indent:2em" | 50 keV
| 21(5) ms
|
|
| (7/2−)
|
|-
| style="text-indent:1em" | 193m2At
| colspan="3" style="text-indent:2em" | 39 keV
| 27(+4−5) ms
|
|
| (13/2+)
|
|-
| rowspan=2|194At
| rowspan=2 style="text-align:right" | 85
| rowspan=2 style="text-align:right" | 109
| rowspan=2|193.99873(20)
| rowspan=2|286(7) ms
| α
| 190Bi
| rowspan=2|(4-, 5-)
| rowspan=2|
|-
| β+ (rare)
| 194Po
|-
| rowspan=2 style="text-indent:1em" | 194mAt
| rowspan=2 colspan="3" style="text-indent:2em" | 480(190) keV
| rowspan=2|323(7) ms
| α
| 190Bi
| rowspan=2|(9-, 10-)
| rowspan=2|
|-
| IT (rare)
| 194At
|-
| rowspan=2|195At
| rowspan=2 style="text-align:right" | 85
| rowspan=2 style="text-align:right" | 110
| rowspan=2|194.996268(10)
| rowspan=2|328(20) ms
| α (75%)
| 191Bi
| rowspan=2|(1/2+)
| rowspan=2|
|-
| β+ (25%)
| 195Po
|-
| style="text-indent:1em" | 195mAt
| colspan="3" style="text-indent:2em" | 34(7) keV
| 147(5) ms
|
|
| (7/2-)
|
|-
| rowspan=2|196At
| rowspan=2 style="text-align:right" | 85
| rowspan=2 style="text-align:right" | 111
| rowspan=2|195.99579(6)
| rowspan=2|253(9) ms
| α (96%)
| 192Bi
| rowspan=2|(3+)
| rowspan=2|
|-
| β+ (4.0%)
| 196Po
|-
| style="text-indent:1em" | 196m1At
| colspan="3" style="text-indent:2em" | −30(80) keV
| 20# ms
|
|
| (10−)
|
|-
| style="text-indent:1em" | 196m2At
| colspan="3" style="text-indent:2em" | 157.9(1) keV
| 11 μs
|
|
| (5+)
|
|-
| rowspan=2|197At
| rowspan=2 style="text-align:right" | 85
| rowspan=2 style="text-align:right" | 112
| rowspan=2|196.99319(5)
| rowspan=2|0.390(16) s
| α (96%)
| 193Bi
| rowspan=2|(9/2−)
| rowspan=2|
|-
| β+ (4.0%)
| 197Po
|-
| style="text-indent:1em" | 197mAt
| colspan="3" style="text-indent:2em" | 52(10) keV
| 2.0(2) s
|
|
| (1/2+)
|
|-
| rowspan=2|198At
| rowspan=2 style="text-align:right" | 85
| rowspan=2 style="text-align:right" | 113
| rowspan=2|197.99284(5)
| rowspan=2|4.2(3) s
| α (94%)
| 194Bi
| rowspan=2|(3+)
| rowspan=2|
|-
| β+ (6%)
| 198Po
|-
| style="text-indent:1em" | 198mAt
| colspan="3" style="text-indent:2em" | 330(90)# keV
| 1.0(2) s
|
|
| (10−)
|
|-
| rowspan=2|199At
| rowspan=2 style="text-align:right" | 85
| rowspan=2 style="text-align:right" | 114
| rowspan=2|198.99053(5)
| rowspan=2|6.92(13) s
| α (89%)
| 195Bi
| rowspan=2|(9/2−)
| rowspan=2|
|-
| β+ (11%)
| 199Po
|-
| rowspan=2|200At
| rowspan=2 style="text-align:right" | 85
| rowspan=2 style="text-align:right" | 115
| rowspan=2|199.990351(26)
| rowspan=2|43.2(9) s
| α (57%)
| 196Bi
| rowspan=2|(3+)
| rowspan=2|
|-
| β+ (43%)
| 200Po
|-
| rowspan=3 style="text-indent:1em" | 200m1At
| rowspan=3 colspan="3" style="text-indent:2em" | 112.7(30) keV
| rowspan=3|47(1) s
| α (43%)
| 196Bi
| rowspan=3|(7+)
| rowspan=3|
|-
| IT
| 200At
|-
| β+
| 200Po
|-
| style="text-indent:1em" | 200m2At
| colspan="3" style="text-indent:2em" | 344(3) keV
| 3.5(2) s
|
|
| (10−)
|
|-
| rowspan=2|201At
| rowspan=2 style="text-align:right" | 85
| rowspan=2 style="text-align:right" | 116
| rowspan=2|200.988417(9)
| rowspan=2|85(3) s
| α (71%)
| 197Bi
| rowspan=2|(9/2−)
| rowspan=2|
|-
| β+ (29%)
| 201Po
|-
| rowspan=2|202At
| rowspan=2 style="text-align:right" | 85
| rowspan=2 style="text-align:right" | 117
| rowspan=2|201.98863(3)
| rowspan=2|184(1) s
| β+ (88%)
| 202Po
| rowspan=2|(2, 3)+
| rowspan=2|
|-
| α (12%)
| 198Bi
|-
| style="text-indent:1em" | 202m1At
| colspan="3" style="text-indent:2em" | 190(40) keV
| 182(2) s
|
|
| (7+)
|
|-
| style="text-indent:1em" | 202m2At
| colspan="3" style="text-indent:2em" | 580(40) keV
| 460(50) ms
|
|
| (10−)
|
|-
| rowspan=2|203At
| rowspan=2 style="text-align:right" | 85
| rowspan=2 style="text-align:right" | 118
| rowspan=2|202.986942(13)
| rowspan=2|7.37(13) min
| β+ (69%)
| 203Po
| rowspan=2|9/2−
| rowspan=2|
|-
| α (31%)
| 199Bi
|-
| rowspan=2|204At
| rowspan=2 style="text-align:right" | 85
| rowspan=2 style="text-align:right" | 119
| rowspan=2|203.987251(26)
| rowspan=2|9.2(2) min
| β+ (96%)
| 204Po
| rowspan=2|7+
| rowspan=2|
|-
| α (3.8%)
| 200Bi
|-
| style="text-indent:1em" | 204mAt
| colspan="3" style="text-indent:2em" | 587.30(20) keV
| 108(10) ms
| IT
| 204At
| (10−)
|
|-
| rowspan=2|205At
| rowspan=2 style="text-align:right" | 85
| rowspan=2 style="text-align:right" | 120
| rowspan=2|204.986074(16)
| rowspan=2|26.2(5) min
| β+ (90%)
| 205Po
| rowspan=2|9/2−
| rowspan=2|
|-
| α (10%)
| 201Bi
|-
| style="text-indent:1em" | 205mAt
| colspan="3" style="text-indent:2em" | 2339.65(23) keV
| 7.76(14) μs
|
|
| 29/2+
|
|-
| rowspan=2|206At
| rowspan=2 style="text-align:right" | 85
| rowspan=2 style="text-align:right" | 121
| rowspan=2|205.986667(22)
| rowspan=2|30.6(13) min
| β+ (99.11%)
| 206Po
| rowspan=2|(5)+
| rowspan=2|
|-
| α (0.9%)
| 202Bi
|-
| style="text-indent:1em" | 206mAt
| colspan="3" style="text-indent:2em" | 807(3) keV
| 410(80) ns
|
|
| (10)−
|
|-
| rowspan=2|207At
| rowspan=2 style="text-align:right" | 85
| rowspan=2 style="text-align:right" | 122
| rowspan=2|206.985784(23)
| rowspan=2|1.80(4) h
| β+ (91%)
| 207Po
| rowspan=2|9/2−
| rowspan=2|
|-
| α (8.6%)
| 203Bi
|-
| rowspan=2|208At
| rowspan=2 style="text-align:right" | 85
| rowspan=2 style="text-align:right" | 123
| rowspan=2|207.986590(28)
| rowspan=2|1.63(3) h
| β+ (99.5%)
| 208Po
| rowspan=2|6+
| rowspan=2|
|-
| α (0.55%)
| 204Bi
|-
| rowspan=2|209At
| rowspan=2 style="text-align:right" | 85
| rowspan=2 style="text-align:right" | 124
| rowspan=2|208.986173(8)
| rowspan=2|5.41(5) h
| β+ (96%)
| 209Po
| rowspan=2|9/2−
| rowspan=2|
|-
| α (4.0%)
| 205Bi
|-
| rowspan=2|210At
| rowspan=2 style="text-align:right" | 85
| rowspan=2 style="text-align:right" | 125
| rowspan=2|209.987148(8)
| rowspan=2|8.1(4) h
| β+ (99.8%)
| 210Po
| rowspan=2|(5)+
| rowspan=2|
|-
| α (0.18%)
| 206Bi
|-
| style="text-indent:1em" | 210m1At
| colspan="3" style="text-indent:2em" | 2549.6(2) keV
| 482(6) μs
|
|
| (15)−
|
|-
| style="text-indent:1em" | 210m2At
| colspan="3" style="text-indent:2em" | 4027.7(2) keV
| 5.66(7) μs
|
|
| (19)+
|
|-
| rowspan=2|211At
| rowspan=2 style="text-align:right" | 85
| rowspan=2 style="text-align:right" | 126
| rowspan=2|210.9874963(30)
| rowspan=2|7.214(7) h
| EC (58.2%)
| 211Po
| rowspan=2|9/2−
| rowspan=2|
|-
| α (42%)
| 207Bi
|-
| rowspan=3|212At
| rowspan=3 style="text-align:right" | 85
| rowspan=3 style="text-align:right" | 127
| rowspan=3|211.990745(8)
| rowspan=3|0.314(2) s
| α (99.95%)
| 208Bi
| rowspan=3|(1−)
| rowspan=3|
|-
| β+ (0.05%)
| 212Po
|-
| β− (2×10−6%)
| 212Rn
|-
| rowspan=2 style="text-indent:1em" | 212m1At
| rowspan=2 colspan="3" style="text-indent:2em" | 223(7) keV
| rowspan=2|0.119(3) s
| α (99%)
| 208Bi
| rowspan=2|(9−)
| rowspan=2|
|-
| IT (1%)
| 212At
|-
| style="text-indent:1em" | 212m2At
| colspan="3" style="text-indent:2em" | 4771.6(11) keV
| 152(5) μs
|
|
| (25−)
|
|-
| 213At
| style="text-align:right" | 85
| style="text-align:right" | 128
| 212.992937(5)
| 125(6) ns
| α
| 209Bi
| 9/2−
|
|-
| 214At
| style="text-align:right" | 85
| style="text-align:right" | 129
| 213.996372(5)
| 558(10) ns
| α
| 210Bi
| 1−
|
|-
| style="text-indent:1em" | 214m1At
| colspan="3" style="text-indent:2em" | 59(9) keV
| 265(30) ns
|
|
|
|
|-
| style="text-indent:1em" | 214m2At
| colspan="3" style="text-indent:2em" | 231(6) keV
| 760(15) ns
|
|
| 9−
|
|-
| 215At
| style="text-align:right" | 85
| style="text-align:right" | 130
| 214.998653(7)
| 0.10(2) ms
| α
| 211Bi
| 9/2−
| Trace
|-
| rowspan=3|216At
| rowspan=3 style="text-align:right" | 85
| rowspan=3 style="text-align:right" | 131
| rowspan=3|216.002423(4)
| rowspan=3|0.30(3) ms
| α (99.99%)
| 212Bi
| rowspan=3|1−
| rowspan=3|
|-
| β− (.006%)
| 216Rn
|-
| EC (3×10−7%)
| 216Po
|-
| style="text-indent:1em" | 216mAt
| colspan="3" style="text-indent:2em" | 413(5) keV
| 100# μs
|
|
| (9−)
|
|-
| rowspan=2|217At
| rowspan=2 style="text-align:right" | 85
| rowspan=2 style="text-align:right" | 132
| rowspan=2|217.004719(5)
| rowspan=2|32.3(4) ms
| α (99.98%)
| 213Bi
| rowspan=2|9/2−
| rowspan=2|Trace
|-
| β− (.012%)
| 217Rn
|-
| rowspan=2|218At
| rowspan=2 style="text-align:right" | 85
| rowspan=2 style="text-align:right" | 133
| rowspan=2|218.008694(12)
| rowspan=2|1.5(3) s
| α (99.9%)
| 214Bi
| rowspan=2|1−#
| rowspan=2|Trace
|-
| β− (0.10%)
| 218Rn
|-
| rowspan=2|219At
| rowspan=2 style="text-align:right" | 85
| rowspan=2 style="text-align:right" | 134
| rowspan=2|219.011162(4)
| rowspan=2|56(3) s
| α (97%)
| 215Bi
| rowspan=2|(9/2-)
| rowspan=2|Trace
|-
| β− (3.0%)
| 219Rn
|-
| rowspan=2|220At
| rowspan=2 style="text-align:right" | 85
| rowspan=2 style="text-align:right" | 135
| rowspan=2|220.01541(6)
| rowspan=2|3.71(4) min
| β− (92%)
| 220Rn
| rowspan=2|3(−#)
| rowspan=2|
|-
| α (8.0%)
| 216Bi
|-
| 221At
| style="text-align:right" | 85
| style="text-align:right" | 136
| 221.01805(21)#
| 2.3(2) min
| β−
| 221Rn
| 3/2−#
|
|-
| 222At
| style="text-align:right" | 85
| style="text-align:right" | 137
| 222.02233(32)#
| 54(10) s
| β−
| 222Rn
|
|
|-
| 223At
| style="text-align:right" | 85
| style="text-align:right" | 138
| 223.02519(43)#
| 50(7) s
| β−
| 223Rn
| 3/2−#
|
|-
| 224At
| style="text-align:right" | 85
| style="text-align:right" | 139
| 224.02975(22)#
| 2.5(1.5) min
| β−
| 224Rn
|
|

Alpha decay  

Astatine has 23 nuclear isomers (nuclei with one or more nucleons – protons or neutrons – in an excited state). A nuclear isomer may also be called a "meta-state"; this means the system has more internal energy than the "ground state" (the state with the lowest possible internal energy), making the former likely to decay into the latter. There may be more than one isomer for each isotope. The most stable of them is astatine-202m1, which has a half-life of about 3 minutes; this is longer than those of all ground states except those of isotopes 203–211 and 220. The least stable one is astatine-214m1; its half-life of 265 ns is shorter than those of all ground states except that of astatine-213.

Alpha decay energy follows the same trend as for other heavy elements. Lighter astatine isotopes have quite high energies of alpha decay, which become lower as the nuclei become heavier. However, astatine-211 has a significantly higher energy than the previous isotope; it has a nucleus with 126 neutrons, and 126 is a magic number (corresponding to a filled neutron shell). Despite having a similar half-life time as the previous isotope (8.1 hours for astatine-210 and 7.2 hours for astatine-211), the alpha decay probability is much higher for the latter: 41.8 percent versus just 0.18 percent. The two following isotopes release even more energy, with astatine-213 releasing the highest amount of energy of all astatine isotopes. For this reason, it is the shortest-lived astatine isotope. Even though heavier astatine isotopes release less energy, no long-lived astatine isotope exists; this happens due to the increasing role of beta decay. This decay mode is especially important for astatine: as early as 1950, it was postulated that the element has no beta-stable isotopes (i.e. ones that do not undergo beta decay at all), though nuclear mass measurements reveal that 215At is in fact beta-stable, as it has the lowest mass of all isobars with A = 215. A beta decay mode has been found for all other astatine isotopes except for astatine-213, astatine-214, and astatine-216m. Among other isotopes: astatine-210 and the lighter isotopes decay by positron emission; astatine-216 and the heavier isotopes undergo beta decay; astatine-212 can decay either way; and astatine-211 decays by electron capture instead.

The most stable isotope of astatine is astatine-210, which has a half-life of about 8.1 hours. This isotope's primary decay mode is positron emission to the relatively long-lived alpha emitter, polonium-210. In total, only five isotopes of astatine have half-lives exceeding one hour: those between 207 and 211. The least stable ground state isotope is astatine-213, with a half-life of about 125 nanoseconds. It undergoes alpha decay to the extremely long-lived (in practice, stable) isotope bismuth-209.

See also

References 

 
 Isotope masses from:

 Isotopic compositions and standard atomic masses from:

 Half-life, spin, and isomer data selected from the following sources.

 
Astatine